Kenneth Quarious Oxendine (born October 4, 1975) is a former professional American football player who played running back for two seasons for the Atlanta Falcons and briefly for the XFL's Los Angeles Xtreme during the 2001 season.

In college, Oxendine played for the Virginia Tech Hokies.

Following his Pro Football career, Oxendine became a physical education instructor.  Since 2006, he has been teaching physical education at Notre Dame Academy in Duluth, Georgia. On July 28, 2012, in Lawrenceville, GA, he married Playboy June 2011 playmate, Mei-Ling Lam.

Oxendine was raised in Chester, Virginia.  He attended Curtis Elementary School, Chester Middle School, and was a graduate of Thomas Dale High School.

References

External links

 
 

1975 births
Living people
American football running backs
Atlanta Falcons players
Los Angeles Xtreme players
Virginia Tech Hokies football players
People from Chester, Virginia
Players of American football from Richmond, Virginia